The Grayson Baronetcy, of Ravenspoint in the County of Anglesey, is a title in the Baronetage of the United Kingdom. It was created on 12 January 1922 for Lt-Col. Sir Henry Grayson, KBE. He was a director of several shipping and shipbuilding companies and also represented Birkenhead West in the House of Commons from 1918 to 1922. The fourth Baronet was a writer and composer.

Grayson baronets, of Ravenspoint (1922)

Sir Henry Mulleneux Grayson, 1st Baronet (1865–1951)
Sir Denys Henry Harrington Grayson, 2nd Baronet (1892–1955)
Sir Ronald Henry Rudyard Grayson, 3rd Baronet (1916–1987)
Sir Rupert Stanley Harrington Grayson, 4th Baronet (1897–1991)
Sir Jeremy Brian Vincent Harrington Grayson, 5th Baronet (born 1933)

Notes

References
Kidd, Charles, Williamson, David (editors). Debrett's Peerage and Baronetage (1990 edition). New York: St Martin's Press, 1990, 

Grayson